The Touloubre is a river in the southeast of France. It runs from Venelles to the Étang de Berre. Other places along its course are Pélissanne, Salon-de-Provence, Grans and Saint-Chamas. It flows into the Étang de Berre, which is connected to the Mediterranean Sea, near Saint-Chamas.

References

External links
Official website in French

Rivers of France
Rivers of Bouches-du-Rhône
Rivers of Provence-Alpes-Côte d'Azur